Tamarixetin is an O-methylated flavonol, a naturally occurring flavonoid.  It has been isolated from  Tamarix ramosissima.

See also
 Isorhamnetin, the 3'-methyl analog
 List of antioxidants in food
 List of phytochemicals in food

References

Flavonols